Carole Baker Lacampagne is a retired mathematician formerly of George Washington University. She is known for her work in mathematics education and gender equality.

Career
Lacampagne received her Ed.D. from Teachers College, Columbia University in 1964. She then worked at Northern Illinois University and the National Science Foundation before moving to the Department of Education in 1991, becoming Director of the National Institute on Postsecondary Education, Libraries, and Lifelong Learning (PLLI). She then became Director of the Mathematical Sciences Education Board at the National Academies of Science before her partial retirement as an adjunct at George Washington University.

Work for gender equality
Lacampagne was actively involved in supporting women in mathematics, and became head of the Women and Mathematic's program of the Mathematical Association of America. She wrote about women and mathematics throughout her career, including her 1979 dissertation.

Awards and honors

In 2012, Lacampagne became a fellow of the American Mathematical Society.

Selected publications
Lacampagne, Carole B., et al. "Gender equity in mathematics." Handbook for achieving gender equity through education (2007): 235–253.
Lacampagne, Carole B. State of the Art: Transforming Ideas for Teaching and Learning Mathematics. US Dept. of Education, OERI Education Information, 555 New Jersey Avenue, NW, Washington, DC 20208-5641

References

Living people
American women mathematicians
20th-century American mathematicians
21st-century American mathematicians
Teachers College, Columbia University alumni
Northern Illinois University faculty
George Washington University faculty
Fellows of the American Mathematical Society
20th-century women mathematicians
21st-century women mathematicians
Year of birth missing (living people)
21st-century American women